The Black Waltz is the fourth full-length studio album by the Finnish melodic death metal band Kalmah and their first with keyboard player Marco Sneck. This album has them gravitating more towards thrash metal, which has often been cited as the Kokko brothers' primary musical influence. The vocals have changed to lower death vocals, compared to their higher pitched growls in previous albums.

The instrumental "Svieri Doroga" is a combination of the name of their first demo Svieri Obraza and a track on that demo entitled "Vezi Doroga". The name of the title track and album comes from a song originally recorded ten years earlier when the band was still named "Ancestor".

The video for "The Groan of Wind" shows the band members playing inside a cave, with alternating shots of a young boy and girl running from their possessed family members. They are later rescued by a disfigured old man, the Swamplord (Odin), whose picture is on the cover of the album.

The album ranked in the top three melodic death metal/Gothenburg albums in 2006. The album peaked at number 48 on the national Finnish album charts.

Track listing

Track 11 length is 4:35 on the Japanese edition.
All lyrics are written by Pekka Kokko, except track 10 (P. Kokko and A. Kokko)

Credits

Band members
 Pekka Kokko − guitars, vocals
 Antti Kokko − guitars
 Marco Sneck − keyboard
 Timo Lehtinen − bass
 Janne Kusmin − drums

Production and other
 All guitar solos performed by Antti Kokko
 Choirs on "Defeat" and "To The Gallows" performed by The Official Kalmah Pig Unit
 Recorded and mixed at Tico-Tico studios in November 2005 by Ahti Kortelainen
 Mastered at Finnvox studios in December 2005 by Mika Jussila
 All music arranged and produced by Kalmah
 Cover artwork, layout and photography by Vesa Ranta

References

External links
 Kalmah official website

Kalmah albums
2006 albums